Monasterio de San Salvador (Celorio) is a monastery in Asturias, Spain.

Monasteries in Asturias